Callisto elegantella is a moth of the family Gracillariidae. It is known from the Russian Far East.

References

Gracillariinae
Moths described in 1979